The South Korea national rugby sevens team is a minor national sevens side. They sometimes take part in the Rugby World Cup Sevens, and have competed in the Hong Kong Sevens since the 1980s.

South Korea made their Olympic debut at the 2020 Tokyo Olympics, they had qualified the previous year after defeating Hong Kong at the 2019 Asia Rugby Sevens Olympic Qualifying Tournament in Incheon.

Tournament history

Summer Olympics

Rugby World Cup Sevens

Asian Games

Hong Kong Sevens results

Sri Lanka Sevens

{| class="wikitable"
|-
!width=40|Year
!width=165|Cup
!width=165|Plate
!width=165|Bowl
|-
|1999||||||
|-
|2000|||||| 
|-
|2001||||||
|-
|2002||||||
|-
|2003||||||
|-
|2004||||||
|-
|2005||||||
|-
|2006||||||
|-
|2007||||||
|-
|2008||||||
|}

Players

Current squad
Squad to the 2021 Olympics in Tokyo:

Head coach: Seo Chun-oh

References
 McLaren, Bill A Visit to Hong Kong in Starmer-Smith, Nigel & Robertson, Ian (eds) The Whitbread Rugby World '90 (Lennard Books, 1989),

Rugby union in South Korea
South Korea national rugby union team
National rugby sevens teams